Adenrele Oluwafemi Edun popularly known as Denrele (born 3 June 1981), is a Nigerian television presenter, actor, model, and dancer who has been recognized with many awards including The Best TV Personality at the NEAs in New York 2011, Dynamix Award for Best Youth TV Personality 2006/2007/2008, The Future Award for Best Producer 2007.

Early life
Denrele was born in Hamburg, Germany, to a Yoruba father and an Indian-Mauritian mother. He is the only son and has two sisters. He grew up in Germany and came to Nigeria when he was five where he attended St Gregory's College, Ikoyi and the University of Lagos.

He was Lead dancer/choreographer for "The Iroko Band' managed by filmmaker, Dr Ola Balogun and later became a Backup dancer for LexyDoo, Ruggedman, Jazzman Olofin, 2Shotz, Lady Di and also "Stage Shakers".

Career
Denrele is known for his fashion style and personality. He started his television career as an actor at eleven when he played a presenter/producer on NTA Network's Kiddivision 101. As an undergraduate at the University of Lagos he went into modelling, and after graduation, he joined Sound City as a TV presenter. Denrele studied English Education at the University of Lagos; It was during this period he had a starring role in the campus based comedy Twilight Zone.  

Denrele is an entertainment personality whose style has been described as "punk and fun". In an interview with ModernGhana, he stated "I am just expressing my individuality. Most people ask me that question and I would say I just want to be me. Some people think I dress (cross-dressing) like this to attract attention, but I have always had attention from childhood".

Denrele has won 16 awards and over 30 nominations in his career. He has previously worked with SoundCity before he quit and moved on to become one of Channel O's VJs.

Denrele has interviewed the likes of Akon, Beyoncé Knowles, Tyler Perry, Lil' Kim, Snoop Dogg, Cuba Gooding, Amerie, and Lloyd. Edun hosted the movie premiere of Hoodrush. Denrele has also been credited for being one of the brains behind the success of Big Brother Amplified Winner Karen Igho.

Denrele Edun and other A-list celebrities starred in the Nollywood movie Make a Move. The movie features artistes like Omawumi, 2face Idibia etc. It was directed by Niyi Akinmolayan and premiered on 6 June 2014.

Filmography 
I am Nazzy

Personal life 
In 2013, he took to his twitter page to announce that he was robbed and everything was carted away by the robbers, putting his grandmother and father in shock.

Awards

See also 
James Brown (internet personality)

References 

1983 births
Living people
Nigerian people of Indian descent
Nigerian people of Mauritian descent
Nigerian writers
Nigerian television personalities
Yoruba television personalities
University of Lagos alumni
St Gregory's College, Lagos alumni
German emigrants to Nigeria
Male-to-female cross-dressers
Television personalities from Lagos
Nigerian television presenters
Nigerian choreographers
Nigerian male dancers
Nigerian dancers